Gian Carlo Casalini (26 April 1934 – 9 February 2009) was an Italian rower. He competed at the 1956 Summer Olympics and the 1960 Summer Olympics.

References

External links
 

1934 births
2009 deaths
Italian male rowers
Olympic rowers of Italy
Rowers at the 1956 Summer Olympics
Rowers at the 1960 Summer Olympics
Sportspeople from Genoa